Tom or Thomas Larson may refer to:
Thomas C. Larson (1909–2007), American politician from Iowa
Thomas D. Larson (1928–2006), American politician from Pennsylvania
Tom Larson (sportscaster), American sportscaster
Tom Larson (Wisconsin politician) (1848–2017)

See also
Tom Larsen (born 1972), Norwegian cyclist